Anna Isabella Gonzaga (12 February 1655 – 11 August 1703), was a Duchess consort of Mantua and Montferrat and heir of the Duchy of Guastalla, including Luzzara and Reggiolo; married in 1671 to Ferdinando Carlo Gonzaga, Duke of Mantua and Montferrat. She was the regent of Mantua in the absence of her spouse in 1691-1692, and during the War of the Spanish Succession in 1702-1703.

Life
Anna Isabella Gonzaga was the daughter of Ferrante III Gonzaga, Duke of Guastalla, and Princess Margherita d'Este (1619–1692), daughter of Alfonso III d'Este, Duke of Modena. As the eldest of two daughters, she was the heir of the Duchy of Guastalla and Luzzara Reggiolo, areas which had long been a source of conflict between the two Gonzaga lines: the Gonzagas of  Guastalla and the Gonzagas of Mantua. In 1671, she was married to Ferdinando Carlo Gonzaga. The marriage was arranged by her aunt, the empress dowager Eleanor Gonzaga, and the purpose was to unite the two Gonzaga lines. The marriage was childless. 

In 1678, her father died, and her rights to Guastalla was challenged by Don Vincenzo Gonzaga, who married her sister, Princess Anna Maria Vittoria (1659–1707) and proclaimed himself Duke of Guastalla. Mantua protested, after which Spain intervened and threatened Mantua. In 1691, Spain attacked Mantua itself, and Ferdinando fled to Venice with his ministers. Anna Isabella served as regent in his absence, assisted by the Imperial representative Marquis degli Obizzi and some advisers. She managed to calm the frightened public and successfully arranged for the defense of Mantua against Spain. She also successfully handled some peace negotiations with Spain between the Spanish governor in Milan and the viceroy of Naples, which was concluded in 1692.   

In 1702, during the War of the Spanish Succession, the Duchy of Mantua was attacked by Imperiali who wished to conquer the areas of Luzzara and Cocoon. Ferdinando fled and left Anna Isabella to handle the situation as regent. During her second regency, she was assisted by Mr de Liesse. She appointed the commanders to handledto defense of Luzzara and Cocoon and issued negotiations for foreign protection of Sabbioneta.

Ancestry

References

 Anna Isabèlla Gonzaga duchessa di Mantova 
 Gonzaga, duchi sovrani di Guastalla. 
 L. Carnevali, Anna Isabella Gonzaga, in Archivio storico lombardo, 1886, p. 378. 

1655 births
1703 deaths
Duchesses of Mantua
Duchesses of Montferrat
17th-century women rulers
Regents of Mantua
18th-century women rulers
Anna Isabella
Women in 17th-century warfare
Women in European warfare